Senator Myers may refer to:

Members of the United States Senate
Francis J. Myers (1901–1956), U.S. Senator from Pennsylvania from 1945 to 1951
Henry L. Myers (1862–1943), U.S. Senator from Montana from 1911 to 1923

United States state senate members
David Myers (Oklahoma politician) (1938–2011), Oklahoma State Senate
James Myers (politician) (1795–1864), Ohio State Senate
Judith A. Myers (born 1939), Illinois State Senate
Michael Myers (New York politician) (1753–1814), New York State Senate
Robert L. Myers (politician) (1928–1993), Pennsylvania State Senate